is a Japanese manga artist. She is one of the Year 24 Group, a collection of female artists who innovated  (girls') manga throughout the 1970s. Her major works include  and  Terpsichora.

Biography
Ryoko Yamagishi was born on September 24, 1947, in Kamisunagawa, Hokkaido, Japan. As a child, she studied ballet, which plays a part in many of her works. When she read the manga of Machiko Satonaka in 1964, she decided to pursue becoming a manga artist. Although her parents did not agree with this, in 1966 she entered a competition in Shōjo Friend and was a semi-finalist. She applied to Kodansha and sent some short stories to COM. In 1968, after completing her art studies in Hokkaido, she moved to Tokyo and applied for Shueisha. The next year, she made her professional debut with Left and Right, a short story published in Ribon Comic, a spin-off of Ribon.

In 1971, she released the one-shot manga , which tells the story of a romance between two students at an all-girls boarding school in France. It was published by Shueisha in Ribon Comic and is regarded as the first  (female-female romance) manga. 

She worked on  Terpsichora, which was nominated for the 9th annual Tezuka Osamu Cultural Prize in 2005 and won the 11th annual Tezuka Osamu Cultural Prize in 2007.

According to Yoshihiro Yonezawa, Yamagishi's style is influenced by Art Nouveau.

Works

Serializations

Selected one-shots

Art books

|+ List of art books by Ryoko Yamagishi

References

Further reading

External links
 
 Profile  at The Ultimate Manga Guide

1947 births
Female comics writers
Japanese female comics artists
Japanese women writers
Living people
Manga artists from Hokkaido
Winner of Kodansha Manga Award (Shōjo)
Women manga artists